Stealing Home is a 1988 American coming of age romantic drama film written and directed by Steven Kampmann and William Porter (billed as Will Aldis). The film stars Mark Harmon, Blair Brown, Jonathan Silverman, Harold Ramis, William McNamara, and Jodie Foster. The movie focuses on a failed baseball player, Billy Wyatt, who discovers that his childhood sweetheart, Katie Chandler, has died by suicide. Billy must confront the past via reminiscence and nostalgia, while also dealing with grief, as he embarks on a journey to fulfill one of Katie's last wishes; that he spread her ashes.

Stealing Home was released theatrically on August 26, 1988 by Warner Bros. Upon release the film was a critical and commercial failure, although David Foster's musical score garnered universal praise. Since its release, with television reruns, and DVD releases, the film has attained cult classic status, praised by audiences for its melancholic and nostalgic themes, performances, and musical score.

Plot
In the 1980s, Billy Wyatt is a washed-up baseball player in his thirties, living in a hotel with a cocktail waitress. One afternoon, he receives a phone call from his mother informing him that his childhood friend Katie Chandler has died by suicide.

Flashbacks to the 1960s show Billy and Katie's relationship. Katie was a slightly older neighborhood girl who babysat Billy for the Wyatts, who were best friends with the Chandlers. Katie mentors Billy, giving him advice on girls and dating. As he grows older, he begins to develop feelings for her, and she reciprocates.

Just after Billy graduates from high school, his father Sam dies in a car accident. Two months later, Katie, Billy, Ginny, and Billy's friend Alan Appleby decide to spend the summer at their summer home, "Seasmoke," as they have done every year, but this time without Billy's dad. As the summer approaches its end, Billy feels Katie is encouraging his mother to move on too quickly, and they have a shouting match.

The next day at sunrise, Billy goes to Katie for forgiveness, and they spend the rest of the weekend together at Seasmoke. As the weekend comes to a close, Katie asks Billy to pursue his passion for baseball and to retrieve the baseball necklace pendant from the girl to whom he lost his virginity just months before. As she walks away slowly, she turns and says, "I love you Billy boy." The older Billy remembers that was the last time he saw her.

In the present, Katie's father, Hank, visits the Wyatt family to share the bad news. He recounts how he drove to Seasmoke to check on an upset Katie after her second divorce and found her body curled up in her bed. "She looked like a little girl sleeping." Katie's final wish is for Billy to be responsible for her ashes, confident he would be the only person to know what to do with them.

Billy reunites with Appleby, and they engage in a night of reminiscing and carousing while driving around in Katie's car with her ashes, trying to figure out what to do with them. Suddenly, Billy recalls Katie telling him her fantasy that she could jump off the pier and fly free with the birds. The next morning, Billy goes to the pier, runs down the dock, and tosses her ashes just the way she described in her fantasy.

Billy joins a minor league baseball team, taking pride in grooming the field each morning before a game. The film ends with Billy, his girlfriend, and Appleby celebrating after a game that he won by "stealing home" (the same thing he did in the last game he played the day his father died).

Cast
 Mark Harmon as Billy Wyatt
 William McNamara as young Billy Wyatt
 Thacher Goodwin as Billy Wyatt (age 10)
 Harold Ramis as Alan Appleby
 Jonathan Silverman as young Alan Appleby
 Blair Brown as Ginny Wyatt
 Richard Jenkins as Hank Chandler
 John Shea as Sam Wyatt
 Christine Jones as Grace Chandler
 Ted Ross as Bud Scott
 Helen Hunt as Hope Wyatt
 Beth Broderick as Leslie
 Jodie Foster as Katie Chandler

Production 

The film plot is set in the Philadelphia area and the New Jersey shore.  The filming occurred in many locations:
 The house that Billy grows up in is located in Chestnut Hill, Philadelphia, where exterior scenes were shot;
 The interiors of Billy's childhood home were filmed in a house located in Springfield, Pennsylvania;
 The scenes in Bob's Diner were filmed at Ridge Avenue in Roxborough;
 Alan Appleby's sporting goods store was located on Germantown Avenue in Chestnut Hill, Philadelphia;
 Carlton Academy is actually Chestnut Hill Academy;
 The opening scene and closing scene were shot at Fiscalini Field in San Bernardino, CA. The team he was shown playing for in the movie was the name of the actual team that played there at the time, The San Bernardino Spirit, partially owned by Harmon.
 Camp Tecumseh, boys summer sports camp T-shirt is seen in the movie.
 Billy and Alan Appleby also sneak into and play baseball at Veterans Stadium, Philadelphia.

Soundtrack

Reception
The film received negative reviews around the time of its release. In her review for the New York Times, Janet Maslin wrote, "The era is simply established as a dreamily idyllic past, thanks to sand dunes at twilight, waves that crash in the distance, shiny red convertibles without seat belts and a musical score that may make you want to weep, for all the wrong reasons". In his one-star review for the Chicago Sun-Times, Roger Ebert wrote, "I detested Stealing Home so much, from beginning to end, that I left the screening wondering if any movie could possibly be that bad". On Rotten Tomatoes the film has an approval rating of 20% based on reviews from 10 critics.

When asked about the film in 2006, Mark Harmon said, "That was about a bunch of actors loving a script, going there and burning it on both ends for five weeks just to get it done. That was a fun one to make. I hear a lot about that role. People really found that movie on video."

Summer of '42

Ever since the release of Summer of '42, Warner Bros. has attempted to buy back the rights to the film, which they sold to author Herman Raucher in lieu of paying him for the script, under the belief that the film would not be financially successful. Stealing Home was greenlit shortly after Raucher denied their latest attempt to purchase the rights, leading to Summer star Jennifer O'Neill's assertion that Stealing Home was "stolen" from Summer. Regardless, she said that she enjoyed the film and called it a "lovely film." Rita Kempley, in her review for the Washington Post, also saw similarities with Summer, describing the film as a "pale comedy-drama by mediocrities Steven Kampmann and Will Aldis. Admittedly a pastiche of their memories, the movie bespeaks the dust of '60s yearbooks and greeting card sentiment. Of course, that stuff can be touching (Summer of '42) or quirky (Gregory's Girl), but here only allergy sufferers will leave with soggy Kleenex."

See also

 List of American films of 1988
 List of fictional suicides

References

External links
 
 
 

1988 films
1988 romantic drama films
1980s sports drama films
American baseball films
American coming-of-age films
Films set in the 1960s
Films set in the 1980s
Films set in Philadelphia
Films set in New Jersey
Films shot in New Jersey
Films shot in Pennsylvania
Films about suicide
Films directed by Steven Kampmann
Films scored by David Foster
Films with screenplays by Steven Kampmann
1980s English-language films
1980s American films